Peter Rowsthorn Snr is an Australian businessman. He is the former chairman of Toll Holdings, Australia's largest transport company. He and Paul Little bought the company in 1986. He is now the owner of Wadham Park and Woodside, a horse training facility and a stud farm respectively.

His elder son, Mark Rowsthorn, was chairman of Toll NZ and an executive director of Toll Holdings.

References

Australian businesspeople
Year of birth missing (living people)
Living people
Toll Group